Chichali Gholamreza (also Romanized as Chīchālī Gholāmreẕā; also known as Chīchālī-e Seh and) is a village in Howmeh Rural District, in the Central District of Andimeshk County, Khuzestan Province, Iran. At the 2006 census, its population was 107, in 20 families.

References 

Populated places in Andimeshk County